Club Mariscal Braun is a football club based in the city of La Paz, Bolivia, which currently competes in the La Paz Regional League. It was founded on August 25, 1952 by the workers of the Cervecería Boliviana Nacional, It is for this reason that it is popularly known as “the beer group” or “the brewers”, the name is a tribute to the Marshal of Montenegro Otto Philipp Braun.

It plays its home games at the Estadio Hernando Siles with capacity for 42,000 spectators.

He was champion of the La Paz Regional League seven times and was also runner-up in the Copa Simón Bolívar in 1999.

He participated in the Bolivian Liga de Fútbol Profesional Boliviano between 2000 and 2002, relegating in that last season.

History

Foundation 

The Mariscal Braun Club was founded on August 25, 1952 by the workers of the Cervecería Boliviana Nacional (CBN), the name is a tribute to marshal Otto Philipp Braun.

They were members of the National Bolivian Brewery who, at the head of the gentlemen: Ramón Manuel Zapata, Ángel Fuentes, Francisco Sánchez, Dario Ortiz, Mario Maldonado, Hugo Córdova, Ismael Prieto, Carlos Buezo, Evaristo Roncal, Hugo A. Valencia, among others; they started the 'black and white' institution exercising as part of the club's first directory.

In the Amateur era of football, Club Mariscal Braun won its first title in the La Paz Football Association in the year 1982 after beating Litoral. In 1988, Mariscal Braun achieved his second star at the expense of Chaco Petrolero. Starting in the late 1980s, it was where the 'Cervecero' team began to position itself among the best teams in the city, demonstrating identity and good team play.

For four consecutive years (from 1990 to 1994), Mariscal Braun was runner-up in the AFLP tournament after losing in the finals against Litoral, Chaco Petrolero (twice) and Always Ready . The 'Blanquinegro' team began to establish itself among the best. Finally, in 1996 and 1998 the story of achieving 2 more sub-championships is repeated. La Paz F.C. (Former Atlético Gonzales) and Litoral were the executioners in those exciting finals. It was from the following year, where the destiny of the club would change.

In 1999, under the presidency of Dr. Luis Alípaz, Mariscal Braun achieved his third title in the AFLP, after beating Litoral. That same year he participated in the 'Simón Bolívar' promotion tournament where he won the runner-up position (defeat on penalties) against Club Atlético Pompeya. Despite this, the 'Cervecero' team manages to win the indirect relegation in a dramatic final to San José, in the first leg they lost in Oruro 1:0 and in the return manages to win 2:1 in the Global they were even (2:2) so it was defined in the penalty kicks where Braun was victorious by 4 to 3 and manages to climb to the Bolivian Primera División for the first time.

Bolivian Primera División era 

In her first season in the league she played her first match against The Strongest on February 6 with adverse result 0:1.

Mariscal Braun participated in the Liga de Fútbol Profesional Boliviano from 2000 to 2002, managing to generate respect from his opponents and sympathy from soccer lovers nationwide. After two years in the top seat of national football, Braun was downgraded.

Hegemony 

In his return to the AFLP tournament, in 2003 Mariscal Braun achieved a new sub-championship after losing the final against La Paz F.C. The years 2005, 2006 and 2007 were unforgettable after winning the three-time championship where the “Cervecera” squad demonstrated hegemony in La Paz football. In 2008 a second place was achieved against ABB so that two years later (2010) the “Blanquinegros” could get rid of the thorn and get their 7th. title.

After 10 years Mariscal Braun returns to recover the seat that corresponds to him.

Leadership 

This is the current directive of Club Mariscal Braun for the 2020 season:

 President: Dr. Luis Alípaz.
 Vice President: Ricardo Alípaz.
 2nd. Vice President: Damian Grisi.
 3rd. Vice President: Gabriel Alípaz.
 General Secretary: Mateo Pacheco.
 Attorney General: Mateo Alípaz.
 Finance area: Pablo Suárez.
 Sports area: Francesco Foglino
 Sports area: Alexander Brockman.
 Sports area: Marcelo Palomeque.
 Marketing Area: Gabriel Kavlin.
 Communication Area: José Garrón.
 Communication area: Juan Camilo Arenas.
 International Relations: Pablo Tavera
 International Relations: Benjamin Rivas

Symbols

Shield 
The coat of arms of Club Mariscal Braun was modified on one occasion. The club made a series of minor changes in 2020. These modifications are the first to be made to the shield since 1952.

Clothing 
The representative colors of Club Mariscal Braun are white and black.

Facilities

Stadium 

It plays its home games at the Hernando Siles Stadium in La Paz, the largest in the country. Inaugurated in 1931, the venue has a capacity for 45,143 spectators, and has hosted three Copas América, numerous qualifying matches for the World Cup FIFA

The stadium is located in the Miraflores neighborhood, at an altitude of 3,601 meters above sea level, making it one of the highest professional stadiums in the world.

Promotions and relegations 
 1999:  Promoted from the Copa Simón Bolívar to the Bolivian Primera División.
 2002:  Relegation from the Bolivian Primera División to the La Paz Regional League.

Players

Awards

National tournaments

Regional tournaments (7)

References

Football clubs in Bolivia
Football clubs in La Paz